is a district in Chiyoda, Tokyo.

History
The area developed as townspeople settled along the Kōshū Kaidō.

In 1878, the Kōjimachi area became , a ward of the city of Tokyo. 
In 1934 and 1938, the addressing system along the Koshu-Kaido was reorganized, creating the 6 chomes subdivision for Kōjimachi that are still used.

In 1947, the Kōjimachi ward was merged with the Kanda ward to form the modern special ward Chiyoda, and the 6 chomes became the Kōjimachi district.

The area centered upon Kōjimachi including the districts of the Banchō area, Kioichō, Hirakawachō and Hayabusachō is sometimes referred as the Kōjimachi area (麹町地区), not to be mistaken with Kōjimachi ward (麹町区).

This place is also known for Hideki Tojo's birthplace, general of the Imperial Japanese Army.

Landmarks and headquarters
Embassy of Portugal
Embassy of Ireland
Embassy of Belgium
Japan Sun Oil Company, handling the Asian business of Sunoco
, a girl's junior and senior high school
Nippon Flour Mills
Nippon Television had its headquarters here, and maintains studios in the former headquarters building
Nitto Boseki, a textile and fiberglass products company
The Japanese subsidiary of SAP
Tokyo FM
Tokyo MX
Hanzōmon Station, Station Z-05 on the Tokyo Metro Hanzomon Line
Kōjimachi Station, Station Y-15 on the Tokyo Metro Yurakucho Line

Education

 operates public elementary and junior high schools. Kōjimachi Elementary School (麹町小学校) is the zoned elementary of Kōjimachi 1-4 chōme. Kōjimachi 5-6 chōme are zoned to Banchō Elementary School (番町小学校) in Rokubanchō. Kōjimachi Elementary was formed from the merger of the former Kōjimachi Elementary and Nagatachō Elementary School (永田町小学校). It began holding classes, in the year 2000, at the former Nagatachō Elementary facility. Its current building opened on April 1, 2003.

There is a freedom of choice system for junior high schools in Chiyoda Ward, and so there are no specific junior high school zones. Chiyoda Ward operates Kojimachi Junior High School (麹町中学校) in Hirakawachō.

References

Neighborhoods of Tokyo
Chiyoda, Tokyo